Iuati spinithorax is a species of beetle in the family Cerambycidae, the only species in the genus Iuati.

References

Cerambycini